The Bastide Les Brégues d'Or is a historic bastide in Luynes, a village near Aix-en-Provence, France.

Location
It is located on the chemin de la Carrière in Luynes, near Aix-en-Provence, in south-east France.

History
The bastide was built in the second half of the 18th century.

Architectural significance
It has been listed as an official historical monument by the French Ministry of Culture since 1989.

References

Houses completed in the 18th century
Monuments historiques of Aix-en-Provence
18th-century architecture in France